Larsia is a genus of non-biting midges in the subfamily Tanypodinae of the bloodworm family Chironomidae.

Species
L. atrocincta (Goetghebuer, 1942)
L. curticalcar (Kieffer, 1918)

References

Tanypodinae
Nematocera genera